Priepasné is a village and municipality in Myjava District in the Trenčín Region of north-western Slovakia.

History
In historical records the village was first mentioned in 1957.

Geography
The municipality lies at an altitude of 430 metres and covers an area of 13.710 km2. It has a population of about 345 people.

External links
http://www.statistics.sk/mosmis/eng/run.html

Villages and municipalities in Myjava District